Sitiveni Moceidreke (born 1 June 1937) is a Fijian former sprinter. He competed in the men's 100 metres and men's 200 metres at the 1960 Summer Olympics. Moceidreke was eliminated in the quarter-finals of the 100 yards as well as of the 220 yards at the 1962 British Empire and Commonwealth Games.

References

External links

1937 births
Living people
Athletes (track and field) at the 1960 Summer Olympics
Fijian male sprinters
Olympic athletes of Fiji
Athletes (track and field) at the 1962 British Empire and Commonwealth Games
Commonwealth Games competitors for Fiji
Place of birth missing (living people)
20th-century Fijian people
21st-century Fijian people